Hyla molleri, also known as the Iberian tree frog or Moller's tree frog, is a species of frog in the family Hylidae, endemic to the Iberian Peninsula and southwesternmost France. It was formerly treated as a subspecies of Hyla arborea, but was split based on genetic differences. The specific name molleri honours Adolphe F. Moller (1842–1920), a Portuguese botanist.

References

Hyla
Amphibians of Europe
Fauna of France
Fauna of Portugal
Fauna of Spain
Amphibians described in 1889
Taxa named by Jacques von Bedriaga